Doru Davidovici (1945–1989), was a Romanian aviator and writer. Born in a Romanian-Jewish family, Doru Davidovici became one of the most loved Romanian fiction writers in the 1980s. During the communist years, his books gave an unusual sense of liberty and new horizons by describing the experience of flying, and the closeness it forged – both between pilots, and between pilots and their machines. The plane is seen by Davidovici not simply as a machine that enables one to fly but as an actual character, with its own personality and almost with its own soul.

His work is influenced by writers like Ray Bradbury, Radu Tudoran and Bertolt Brecht.
The titles include The Horses of Voroneţ (1974), The Colour of the Sky (1981), Silver Wings (1983) and Rise and Walk (1989). 

Keeping a sense of proportion, it is reasonable to draw a parallel between Davidovici and the French aviator and writer Antoine de Saint Exupéry. They both found a source of literary inspiration in their profession, and they both died, at about the same age, flying a fighter plane.

Beside his narrative work, Doru Davidovici is known for his essay on the UFOs, My colleagues from the unknown. Here Davidovici regards, once again through his pilot eyes, the UFOs and the issues raised by their presumed existence.

Doru Davidovici lost his life together with Dumitru Petra on 20 April 1989 during landing procedures while flying his MiG-21 from a training flight back home to RoAF 86th Air Base.

Literary works
His published works include:
Caii de la Voroneț (1973)
Ultima aventură a lui Nat Pinkerton (1975)
Insula nevăzută (1976)
Intrarea actorilor (1977)
Zeița de oricalc (1977)
Celula de alarmă (1979)
Culoarea cerului (1981)
Aripi de argint (1983)
Lumi galactice (1986)
V de la Victorie (1987)

Published posthumously
Ridică-te și mergi (1991)
Dezmințire la Mit (1991)

References

External links
webpage dedicated to Doru Davidovici 
Doru Davidovici as SF writer & UFO researcher 
"Winged Child of the Blue", article about Doru Davidovici

1945 births
1989 deaths
Aviators killed in aviation accidents or incidents in Romania
Jewish Romanian writers
Romanian male novelists
Romanian aviators
Romanian Air Force officers
20th-century Romanian novelists
20th-century Romanian male writers
Victims of aviation accidents or incidents in 1989